Gaberje is a district of the City Municipality of Celje and a neighbourhood of the town of Celje in central-eastern Slovenia. It is particularly known  as a workers' settlement.

References

External links

Geography of Celje
Districts of the City Municipality of Celje